The matchup of Buriram United versus Muangthong United is considered by Thai football media and followers as the biggest football match in Thailand due to their dominance in Thai Football in the modern era. The two clubs are the most successful Thai teams in professional league age. Both clubs are the only two clubs that have won the top league of Thailand from the promotion of Muangthong United to Thai League 1 in 2009 until 2018.

Buriram United and Muangthong United are mainly the competitive rivals since both are located in the different regions of Thailand. However, both clubs also represent the different group of supporters among them. Buriram represents the rustic people in the countryside while Muangthong United symbolizes the urban people in the Bangkok Metropolitan Region since Muangthong is located in Nonthaburi Province which was the part of Thailand capital city, Bangkok until 1956 while and Buriram United is located on the frontier side, Buriram Province which is 238-mile-far from Bangkok.

History

Promotion of Muangthong United 
Muangthong United was founded in 1989 as Nongjorg Pittayanusorn Football Club by Worawi Makudi.

In 2009, Muangthong United which has owned by Siam Sport Syndicate (Thai biggest sports multimedia) successfully climbed three divisions from Thai Regional League Division 2 to Thai Premier League within the  3 years of span. The newly promoted club invested the significant of a fund to the team since they had a high ambition to reach the continental football. In that season, Provincial Electricity Authority F.C. (PEA)  (later re-established to Buriram United) was the defending champion from the 2008 season. Both clubs met two times in the league and Muangthong won all of them. Muangthong finished their first season in their top league with the champion title. PEA FC finished at a ninth place out of sixteen clubs in the league.

Establishing of Buriram United 
In December 2009 after the underwhelming performance of PEA FC,  it was announced that a politician based in Buriram, Newin Chidchob was to take over the club. He had already tried unsuccessfully to take over TOT SC and Royal Thai Army FC Newin relocated the club to Buriram in Isan and rebranded it to Buriram PEA Football Club. The Buriram PEA inherited most of the players from the former PEA club included the stars like Rangsan Vivatchaichok, Apichet Puttan and Theerathon Bunmathan. Pongphan Wongsuwan who was a long-time head coach of TOT S.C. was instated as coach. Thailand national team member Suchao Nuchnum of TOT S.C. also followed his coach to the new team.

Muanthong United won back-to-back Thai Premier League in 2010 while Buriram finished as the runner-up in their first season of a new era.

The Rivalry
In the early state of both clubs, the rivalry was mainly the competitive contest between them. However, it later developed into the conflict among supporters.

The rivalry of both teams started in 2012 from the conflict between Football Association of Thailand and Buriram United. Worawi Makudi who was the founder of Muangthong United has the deep relation with Siam Sports Syndicate was that time the president of the FAT.  Newin Chidchob, the president of Buriram United frequently questioned the transparency of FAT and the bias of referees and schedule toward Muangthong United. Due to the conflict, Siam Sport eventually bashed Newin Chidchob and Buriram United through their media channels which covered most of the local football in Thailand in that time.

In the late of 2012 season, Buriram United won Thai Premier League and request to hold the Trophy ceremony at their home in the match before the last one. However, that time FAT president Worawi Makudi declined the request and forced them to receive the trophy at United Stadium of Chiang Rai that was the venue of their last match. After the game, Buriram United reacted by sending two staff to receive the trophy and head back to the club without any celebration to show their protest against the Makudi.

Buriram United and Muangthong United have become the opposite poles after that. The supporters started to throw the hate to each side. Both supporters packed the stadium of two clubs whenever there was the matchup between them.

Honours

The premier honours of Buriram United Muangthong United since 2009

 Buriram United and Muangthong United share the title of 2016 Thai League Cup winner.

Head-to-head

The competitive head-to-head of Buriram United and Muangthong United since 2010

All-time results

Fixtures from 2010 to the present day featuring League games, Thai FA Cup, Thai League Cup, Kor Royal Cup and Exhibition game.

Player records

All-time top scorers

Figures for active players (in bold) .

Players who played for both clubs
sort by year of joining the second club.

Managed both clubs

References

Association football rivalries
Football in Thailand
Buriram United F.C.
Muangthong United F.C.
2010 establishments in Thailand